Hailu Zewde (born 13 September 1974) is an Ethiopian middle-distance runner. He competed in the men's 1500 metres at the 1992 Summer Olympics.

References

1974 births
Living people
Athletes (track and field) at the 1992 Summer Olympics
Ethiopian male middle-distance runners
Olympic athletes of Ethiopia
Place of birth missing (living people)